Demant is a surname. Notable people with the name include:

Kiritapu Demant (born 1996), New Zealand rugby union player
Peter Demant (1918–2006), Russian writer
Ruahei Demant (born 1995), New Zealand rugby union player
V. A. Demant (1893–1983), English priest